MCA may refer to:

Astronomy 
 Mars-crossing asteroid, an asteroid whose orbit crosses that of Mars

Aviation 
 Minimum crossing altitude, a minimum obstacle crossing altitude for fixes on published airways
 Medium Combat Aircraft, a 5th generation fighter aircraft in India's HAL AMCA (Advanced Medium Combat Aircraft) program
 Macenta Airport, Guinea (by IATA code)

Biology and chemistry 
MacConkey agar, a selective growth medium for bacteria
Monochloroacetic acid, carboxylic acid, manufactured by chlorinating acetic acid
 Methylcholanthrene, a carcinogen
 Methyl cyanoacrylate, an organic compound
 Metabolic control analysis, analysing how the control of fluxes and intermediate concentrations in a metabolic pathway is distributed
 Middle cerebral artery, one of the three major blood supplies to the brain

Climate 
  Medieval Climatic Anomaly (Medieval Warm Period, also Medieval Climate Optimum), a notably warm climatic period in the North Atlantic region from about 950 to 1250.

Companies 
 MCA Inc., a now defunct company (originally called Music Corporation of America) and its subsidiary companies:
 MCA Records
 MCA Nashville Records
 MCA Home Video, former name of Universal Studios Home Entertainment
 MCA Music Inc. (Philippines), a Philippine branch of Universal Music Group which uses the MCA brand due to a trademark issue
 Maubeuge Construction Automobile (MCA), a subsidiary of French car manufacturer Renault
 Minato Communications Association, a former company name of the Japan Electronics and Information Technology Industries Association

Education

Degrees 
 Master in Customs Administration, a trade-related graduate degree offered in PMI Colleges in the Philippines
 Master of Computer Applications, a postgraduate degree in computer science offered in India

Educational institutions 
 Marist College Ashgrove, an Australian School
 McIntosh County Academy, a high school in McIntosh County, Georgia, United States
 Memphis College of Art, an art school in Tennessee, United States
 Morrison Christian Academy, an American school in Taiwan

Professional courses
 Microsoft Certified Architect, a certification available from Microsoft
 Minnesota Comprehensive Assessments—Series II, a standardized test in Minnesota

Legal
 Depository Institutions Deregulation and Monetary Control Act, a US financial statute passed in 1980
 Mental Capacity Act 2005, an Act of the Parliament of the United Kingdom applying to England and Wales
 Military Commissions Act of 2006, US legislation

Organizations
Maharashtra Chess Association
Malaysian Chinese Association, a political party in Malaysia
Maritime and Coastguard Agency, an agency of the United Kingdom Government
Medal Collectors of America
Medicines Control Agency, which merged with the Medical Devices Agency to become the Medicines and Healthcare products Regulatory Agency 
Metal Construction Association
Millennium Challenge Account, a U.S. program for aid to developing countries
Ministry of Corporate Affairs, an Indian government ministry
MultiCultural Aotearoa, a New Zealand political action group
Mumbai Cricket Association, ruling body for cricket in Mumbai
Multicore Association, an industry association regrouping companies and universities interested in multicore computing research.
 Museum of Contemporary Art (disambiguation), numerous museums around the world

People 
 Adam Yauch (1964–2012), a.k.a. "MCA", of the Beastie Boys
 Michiel van den Bos (born 1975), a.k.a. "M.C.A.", Dutch composer
 Chris Avellone (born 1971), a.k.a. "MCA", American video game designer

Sports 
 MC Alger, a football club based in Algiers, Algeria
 Manitoba Curling Association, Manitoba, Canada
 Maharashtra Cricket Association, Pune, India
 Maharashtra Cricket Association Stadium, Pune, India
 Mumbai Cricket Association, Mumbai, India

Technology 
 Machine Check Architecture, a method for a CPU to report hardware errors to an operating system
 Maximum credible accident, a postulated scenario that a nuclear facility must be able to withstand
 Micro Channel architecture, a type of computer bus
 Mitsubishi MCA, an emissions control approach for gasoline-powered vehicles during the 1970s
 Movable cellular automaton
 Multichannel analyzer, instrument recording pulse counts at a range of (esp. photon energy) levels

Other uses 
 Medieval Climate Anomaly
 Metropolitan Church Association, Methodist denomination in the holiness movement 
 Motor Coach Age, the magazine of the Motor Bus Society
 Multiple correspondence analysis
 The Maká language (ISO 639-3 Code)